Haushofer is a German language occupational surname, which means a worker or manager of a farm house or manor house. Related names include Hoffman, Hofer and Höfer. The surname Haushofer may refer to

Albrecht Haushofer (1903–1945), German geographer
Karl Haushofer (1869–1946), German general and geographer
Marlen Haushofer (1920–1970), Austrian author
Max Haushofer (1811–1866), German painter

References

German-language surnames